National Mills is a community in the Canadian province of Manitoba. It is part of a group of five communities in the region, all built to serve logging operations in the Porcupine Provincial Forest. The others are Powell, Baden, Red Deer Lake, and the largest, Barrows, where the nearest school and fire service are located. The community contains four housing units.

Demographics 

References 

Designated places in Manitoba
Northern communities in Manitoba